Andrew Harrison (born 2 May 1957) is a British businessman and former management consultant, currently the chairman of Dunelm Group. He previously served as the CEO of The RAC, easyJet and Whitbread.

Early life 
Harrison was educated at Hitchin Boys' Grammar School and Bristol Grammar School, an independent day school. He went on to study economics at Pembroke College, Cambridge.

Career 
Prior to joining the RAC, Harrison held the roles of managing director of Courtaulds International Fabrics and finance director of Courtaulds Textiles plc. He was also a non-executive director at EMAP.

He was the chief executive of the automotive services company the RAC (previously Lex Services plc) from 1996 to 2005.

Harrison was announced as Ray Webster's successor as CEO of easyJet in September 2005. Harrison announced his intention to leave easyJet in December 2009 and departed in 2010 as Sir Stelios Haji-Ioannou, the airline's founder, described him as "overrated".

Harrison became CEO of the British multinational hotel, coffee shop and restaurant company Whitbread in 2010, replacing Alan Parker. Harrison left in 2015, succeeded by Alison Brittain.

Harrison became chairman of Dunelm Group in July 2015.

References

External links 

 Biography at Dunelm

1957 births
Living people
British chief executives
British corporate directors
People educated at Bristol Grammar School
Alumni of Pembroke College, Cambridge